Thomas Robert Mellor (born January 27, 1950) is an American former professional ice hockey defenseman. He played 26 games in the National Hockey League with the Detroit Red Wings during the 1973–74 and 1974–75 seasons. Internationally Mellor played for the American national team at the 1972 Winter Olympics, winning a silver medal.

Playing career
Before being drafted by the Detroit Red Wings, Mellor played hockey for Boston College. In the 1968–69 season, he scored nine goals and 19 points in his 17-game rookie season. In his sophomore season, he scored 21 goals and 44 points in 26 games. He scored a hat trick for Boston College in a 13–6 win over Rensselaer Polytechnic Institute. In his junior year in the NCAA he had 40 points in 25 games for the Boston Eagles. During his years at Boston College, he led Boston College in assists on two occasions (1971: 30; 1973: 45) and was ranked third for most assists in a season at Boston College. He was also a two-time recipient (1971, 1973) of Boston College's Norman F. Dailey Memorial Award as the team's Most Valuable Player. He was inducted into the Boston College Varsity Club Athletic Hall of Fame in 1980.

Mellor was drafted 68th overall by the Detroit Red Wings in 1970 NHL Amateur Draft and played 26 regular season games in the National Hockey League for Detroit between 1973 and 1975. Mellor also played in the American Hockey League for the Virginia Wings; in the International Hockey League for the Toledo Goaldiggers; and in the Swedish Elitserien with Västra Frölunda. As a player in the IHL,  he was named to the First-Team All-Star Team, he won the James Gatschene Memorial Trophy and the Governor's Trophy in 1977, his last season as a professional player before retiring.

As an amateur, Mellor represented the United States national team at the 1972 Winter Olympics in Sapporo, winning a silver medal. Mellor also played in the 1971, 1972 and 1973 Ice Hockey World Championship tournaments.

Mellor was formally inducted into the Rhode Island Hockey Hall of Fame in 2022. At the same enshrinement ceremony, his 101-year-old father, Don Mellor, a pioneer youth hockey organizer, was honored by the Hall with the Malcolm Greene Chace Memorial Trophy for "Lifetime Achievement of a Rhode Islander to the game of hockey."

Career statistics

Regular season and playoffs

International

Awards and honors

References

External links
 
 Tom Mellor @ hockeydraftcentral.com

1950 births
Living people
AHCA Division I men's ice hockey All-Americans
American men's ice hockey defensemen
Boston College Eagles men's ice hockey players
Detroit Red Wings draft picks
Detroit Red Wings players
Frölunda HC players
Ice hockey players from Rhode Island
Ice hockey players at the 1972 Winter Olympics
London Lions (ice hockey) players
Medalists at the 1972 Winter Olympics
Olympic silver medalists for the United States in ice hockey
Sportspeople from Cranston, Rhode Island
Toledo Goaldiggers players
Virginia Wings players